György (George) Spiró (born 4 April 1946 in Budapest) is a dramatist, novelist and essayist who has emerged as one of post-war Hungary's most prominent literary figures. He is a member of the Széchenyi Academy of Literature and Arts.

Life 

The son of an engineer from Miskolc in eastern Hungary, he graduated in Hungarian and Slavic literature from the Eötvös Loránd University (ELTE) in 1970, and completed additional studies in journalism and sociology. His earlier career was spent in radio journalism. More recently, in addition to his writing, he has been employed as associate professor at the Department of World Literature and currently at the Institute of Art Theory and Media Studies at ELTE.

His plays have won numerous awards, including several for best Hungarian drama of the year. A few of them are available in English translation. The best known one is Csirkefej (Chickenhead, 1986), an earthy and bitter drama of a young delinquent's disillusionment at the longed-for reunion with his drunken father. Dramatic Exchange said it was "widely considered to be the most important Hungarian play of the last 20 years".

His avant-garde style, depicting coarse language and characters outside the pale of respectability, often dismayed more traditional Hungarian critics.

His book, Az Ikszek (The X-s), which appeared in 1981, is a historical novel about the National Theatre of Poland in the first years of the 19th  century, with Wojciech Bogusławski as the main character. The novel is about the fight of the artists against censorship.

In 2005, he published an 800-page novel, Fogság (Captivity). Set in the Roman Empire in the time of the Julio-Claudian dynasty, it follows the experiences of a Jewish wanderer named Uri. Spiró's earlier works eschewed Jewish themes, but in this work he returns to his ancestral roots.

In 2007, he published the rewritten Messiások (Messiahs), another historical novel, for which he was awarded the Angelus Award.

The hugely successful Tavaszi Tárlat (Spring Exhibition, 2010) describes the early days of the Kádár regime.

Selected bibliography

Novels 

 Kerengő (1974)
 Az Ikszek (1981)
 A Jövevény (1990)
 A Jégmadár (2001)
 Fogság (2005). Captivity, trans. Tim Wilkinson (2015)
Messiások (2007)
 Feleségverseny (2009)
 Tavaszi Tárlat (2010)
 Diavolina (2015)
Kőbéka. Mesély (2017)

Plays 

 1982 – A békecsászár (Hannibál; Balassi Menyhárt; Kőszegők; Káró király; A békecsászár)
 1987 – Csirkefej (Jeruzsálem pusztulása; Az imposztor; A kert; Esti műsor; Csirkefej)
 1997 – Mohózat (Ahogy tesszük; Legújabb Zrínyiász; Árpádház; Dobardan; Vircsaft; Kvartett)
 2002 – Honderű (Honderű, Fogadó a Nagy Kátyúhoz, Szappanopera, Elsötétítés)

Poetry 

 História (1977)

References

External links 
 An English translation of the play Chickenhead
 Home page with reviews of the novel Fogság, in Hungarian 

1946 births
Living people
Writers from Budapest
Hungarian Jews
Translators to Hungarian

International Writing Program alumni
Members of the Széchenyi Academy of Literature and Arts